"Fallin'" is a song by Australian recording artist Jessica Mauboy. It was released digitally on 9 June 2017 as the lead single from Mauboy's second soundtrack album, The Secret Daughter Season Two: Songs from the Original 7 Series. Mauboy performed the song live on The Voice Australia on 25 June 2017.

Reception
Audio Premiere described the song as "a classic soulful slice of R&B infused with her tender and emotional vocals." "Fallin'" received three nominations at the 2017 ARIA Music Awards for Song of the Year, Best Pop Release and Best Video.

Track listing
Digital download / CD single
"Fallin'" (Kayla Rae Bonnici, Peter James Harding, Louis Schoorl) – 3:07

Charts

Weekly charts

Year-end charts

Certifications

Release history

References

2017 songs
2017 singles
Jessica Mauboy songs
Songs written by Jessica Mauboy
Sony Music Australia singles
Songs written by Louis Schoorl
Songs written by Ivy Adara